Kressbronn am Bodensee is a municipality and a village in the district of Bodensee in Baden-Württemberg in Germany. It lies on Lake Constance.

Between 1919 and 2011, Kressbronn was the site of the Bodan-Werft shipyard, which built many of the ferries and other vessels used on Lake Constance and other Alpine lakes.

The lawyer Nicolas Becker was born in Kressbronn am Bodensee in 1946.

References 

Bodenseekreis